Cotoneaster nummularius, the nummular or coinwort cotoneaster is a species of cotoneaster. This woody shrub is native to much of Asia and south eastern Europe.

Description
Cotoneaster nummularius is a mountainous winter deciduous woody shrub covered in alternate dull green rounded to oval-shaped leaves with fuzzy white undersides and blooms in clusters of 3 to 5 with white hermaphrodite flowers. It flowers from April to June; the fruits are red slightly felted pomes that darken to a bluish black color.

Distribution
The species is found in Greece, Crete, Lebanon, Syria, Israel / Palestine, Turkey, Cyprus, Iraq, Yemen, Oman, Saudi Arabia, Caucasus, Iran, Turkestan, Afghanistan, Tajikistan, Uzbekistan, Azerbaijan, Armenia, Gruziya, Caucasus, Pakistan, Northwestern India, China, Kazakhstan and Kyrgyzstan.

Uses
Cotoneaster nummularis is used in folk medicine; decoctions made from the fruits is taken orally as an appetite stimulant, stomachic and expectorant.

References

Flora of Armenia
Flora of Turkey
Flora of Lebanon
Flora of Cyprus
nummularius
Flora of Israel
Flora of Palestine (region)